Werai is a locality in the Southern Highlands of New South Wales, Australia, in Wingecarribee Shire. 

At the 2021 census, 98 people were living at Werai.

Notes and references

See also
 Werai railway station

Towns of the Southern Highlands (New South Wales)
Wingecarribee Shire